Filimonas aurantiibacter is a Gram-negative bacterium from the genus of Filimonas which has been isolated from water from the Lake Michigan.

References

External links
Type strain of Filimonas aurantiibacter at BacDive -  the Bacterial Diversity Metadatabase

Chitinophagia
Bacteria described in 2016